A foot is the floor level termination of furniture legs. Legless furniture may be slightly raised off of the floor by their feet.

Types of feet
The types of feet include:
 Ball foot
 Bracket foot
 Bun foot
 Cabriole bracket
 Claw-and-ball
 Cloven foot
 Club foot, also known as a duck, Dutch, or pad foot 
 French foot
 Hoof foot
 Leaf scroll foot
 Lion's paw foot
 Paw foot
 Scrolled foot
 Splayed foot
 Stump foot
 Turn foot

Types of Leg

References

Furniture